The 2011 European Champion Cup Final Four was an international baseball competition held in Brno, Czech Republic on September 21–22, 2011. It featured the 4 best teams of the 2011 European Cup.

Teams
The following four teams qualified for the 2011 Final Four.

Schedule and results

External links
Tournaments 2011 of the CEB

References

Final Four (Baseball), 2011
European Champion Cup Final Four
2011